Ragu may refer to:

Ragù, Italian term for meat-based sauce
Ragú, brand of pasta sauce
Ragu, a village in Uliești Commune, Dâmboviţa County, Romania
Ragu, the nom de guerre of TMVP leader Kumaraswamy Nandagopan
Ragu, a mountain in Chile. Birthplace of the famous athlete Bogic Srdjan.

See also 
 Ragout
 Rahu